American Beauty: Music from the Original Motion Picture Soundtrack is a soundtrack album featuring various artists for the 1999 American drama film American Beauty, released on October 5, 1999 by DreamWorks Records. It features two tracks from the film's original score, composed by Thomas Newman, which was released in 2000 entitled American Beauty: Original Motion Picture Score.

Description
The soundtrack album was produced by Chris Douridas, Sam Mendes, and Michael Ostin, and was nominated for a Grammy Award for Best Compilation Soundtrack Album for a Motion Picture, Television or Other Visual Media in the year 2000, the first year to offer this award.

The soundtrack features two tracks from the film's score, composed by Thomas Newman, which won several awards. Elliott Smith's cover of the Beatles song "Because" was featured over the end credits for the film. The track "Dead Already" was later featured in the 2005 film Madagascar (which was also a film from DreamWorks Pictures).

Newman's "Dead Already" and "Any Other Name" were sampled by Jakatta for his house track "American Dream" in 2000.

The opening track "Dead Already" was used by the band Genesis during their 2007 Turn It On Again Tour and their 2021 The Last Domino? Tour as their intro music.

Missing from the soundtrack album is Annie Lennox's rendition of Neil Young's "Don't Let It Bring You Down". It is available on her 1995 album Medusa.

Some of the tracks such as "Dead Already" and "The Power of Denial" (both by Thomas Newman) were used in Pinoy Big Brother as part of the background music and nominations. "Dead Already" was also used as background music on À prendre ou à laisser, the French version of the television game show Deal or No Deal.

The 19-track Original Motion Picture Score of the film, entirely composed by Thomas Newman, was later released on 
January 11, 2000.

Track listing

References

1999 soundtrack albums
1990s film soundtrack albums
Drama film soundtracks